Kohlu (Urdu and ) is the capital of Kohlu District in Pakistan's Balochistan province.In· May 1892 a sub-tahsil was established at Kohlu, the income being treated as a part of the Zhob Revenues. The sub-tahsil was abolished in 1895.

References

Populated places in Kohlu District
Kohlu District